Matlock Town Football Club is a football club based in Matlock, Derbyshire, England.

History
The club was established in 1878 as Matlock Football Club. They began entering the FA Cup in 1885, but did not win a match in the competition until 1890. In that year the club were founder members of the Derbyshire Senior League and went on to win the title in the league's inaugural season. After winning the league again the following season, they joined the Midland Amateur Alliance in 1892. However, the league was disbanded at the end of the 1892–93 season and Matlock returned to the Derbyshire Senior League. They subsequently joined the Midland League in 1894; after finishing bottom of the league in their first season, the club lost all 28 league matches in 1895–96 and left the league, again returning to the Derbyshire Senior League. They finished bottom of the league in 1897–98.

After World War I the club was renamed Matlock Town. They joined the Central Alliance in 1924, but the league folded at the end of the 1924–25 season and the club rejoined the Derbyshire Senior League, in which they were runners-up in 1926–27. In 1933 they joined the new Central Combination, but left after two season. After World War II the club played in the Chesterfield & District League for the 1946–47 season, before the Central Alliance was re-established in 1947, with Matlock becoming members again. When the league gained a second division in 1950, they became members of Division One. Despite finishing bottom of the division in 1951–52, the club were not relegated.

In 1955–56 Matlock finished bottom of Division One again. The league was then reorganised, with the club placed in Division One North. They won the division in 1959–60, also reaching the first round of the FA Cup, losing 1–0 to Crook Town in a replay. After retaining the league title the following season, the club moved up to the reformed Midland League, which they won at the first attempt. They were Midland League champions again in 1968–69, subsequently joining the Northern Premier League. They reached the first round of the FA Cup again in 1974–75, losing 4–1 at home to Blackburn. In the FA Trophy the club reached the final at Wembley Stadium, in which they defeated Scarborough 4–0 to win the trophy; three Matlock players in the final were brothers, the only occasion on which three brothers have played for the same team in a Wembley final. The following season saw them automatically qualify for the first round, but they lost 4–1 at Wigan Athletic.

Matlock were drawn against Wigan in the first round of the FA Cup again in 1976–77, this time winning 2–0. They went on to beat eventual Third Division champions Mansfield Town in an incredible 5–2 away from home, marking the first time the club had defeated Football League opposition. In the third round they lost 5–1 at Carlisle United. The club won the Northern Premier League's Challenge Cup and the Peter Swales Shield in 1977–78. In 1979 they entered the Anglo-Italian Cup, finishing second in the English section. The 1983–84 season saw them finish as runners-up in the Northern Premier League. When the league gained a second division in 1987 the club became members of the Premier Division. Another FA Cup first round appearance in 1989–90 ended in a 4–1 defeat at Scunthorpe United. After finishing bottom of the division in 1995–96, they were relegated to Division One.

In 2003–04 Matlock were Division One runners-up, earning promotion to the Premier Division. They won the league's Challenge Cup the following season. A fifth-place finish in the Premier Division in 2007–08 led to the club qualifying for the promotion playoffs, in which they lost 4–2 to Witton Albion in the semi-finals.

Ground

The club originally played at Hall Leys, before moving to Causeway Lane, which is shared with the local cricket club, with temporary railing installed on one side of the pitch at the end of the cricket season. A wooden stand was built on one side of the pitch in 1920 and was later named the Cyril Harrison Stand. Another wooden stand was built on the other side of the pitch in 1959, with seats installed in the late 1960s.

Floodlights were erected in 1970 and a new terrace installed next to one of the stands prior to the FA Cup first round match against Blackburn in 1974, which attracted a then-record attendance of 5,123. More seats were installed in 1975 and that year saw a new record attendance of 5,123 set for an FA Trophy semi-final match against Burton Albion. A covered terrace was built at the Town End of the ground in the 1980s.

Current squad

Honours

FA Trophy
Winners 1974–75
Northern Premier League
Challenge Cup winners 1977–78, 2004–05
Shield winners 1978–79
Midland League
Champions 1961–62, 1968–69
Central Alliance
North Division champions 1959–60, 1960–61
Derbyshire Senior League
Champions 1890–91, 1891–92
Derbyshire Senior Cup
Winners 1974–75, 1976–77, 1977–78, 1983–84, 1984–85, 1991–92, 2003–04, 2009–10, 2014–15, 2016–17
Evans Halshaw Floodlit Cup
Winners 1988–89, 1990–91

Records
Best FA Cup performance: Third round, 1976–77
Best FA Trophy performance: Winners, 1974–75
Biggest win: 10–0 vs Lancaster City, 1974
Heaviest defeat: 8–0 vs Chorley, 1971
Record attendance: 5,123 vs Burton Albion, FA Trophy semi-final, 1975
Most appearances: Mick Fenoughty
Most goals: Peter Scott
Record transfer fee paid: £2,000 for Kenny Clark, 1996
Record transfer fee received: £10,000 for Ian Helliwell from York City, 1987

See also
Matlock Town F.C. players
Matlock Town F.C. managers

References

External links
Official website

 
Football clubs in England
Association football clubs established in 1878
1878 establishments in England
Midland Football League (1889)
Central Alliance
Central Combination
Northern Premier League clubs
Football clubs in Derbyshire
Matlock, Derbyshire